The Antelope Valley Solar Ranch 1 (AVSR1) is a 230 megawatt (MWAC) photovoltaic power plant near Lancaster within Antelope Valley, in the western Mojave Desert, Southern California.  It uses cadmium telluride modules made by the US thin-film manufacturer First Solar.  The project was developed by First Solar and later bought by Exelon Corporation in 2011. The solar facility was fully commissioned in April 2014.

Overview
In September 2011, the U.S. Department of Energy issued a $646 million loan guarantee to support the project's construction. This loan guarantee was part of the American Recovery and Reinvestment Act of 2009. The project is expected to create 350 construction jobs and 20 permanent jobs.

On February 20, 2013, the first 100 MWAC came online. The plant will use approximately 3.8 million solar panels, about 20% of which will be mounted on single-axis tracking racks. When fully operational, the plant is expected to generate enough energy for 75,000 homes, displacing 140,000 tons of CO2. The power generated by AVSR1 is being purchased by Pacific Gas and Electric Company (PG&E) under a 25-year Power Purchase Agreement.

Electricity Production

See also 

Solar power plants in the Mojave Desert
Solar power in California
List of photovoltaic power stations
Renewable energy in the United States
Renewable portfolio standard

References

Solar power in the Mojave Desert
Solar Ranch
Photovoltaic power stations in the United States
Solar power stations in California
Buildings and structures in Los Angeles County, California